The Annual Review of Financial Economics is a peer-reviewed academic journal that publishes an annual volume of review articles relevant to financial economics. It was established in 2009 and is published by Annual Reviews. The co-editors are Hui Chen and Matthew P. Richardson.

History
The Annual Review of Financial Economics was first published in 2009 by Annual Reviews. Its founding editors were Andrew Lo and Robert C. Merton. As of 2022, the editors are Hui Chen and Matthew P. Richardson.

Scope and indexing
The Annual Review of Financial Economics defines its scope as covering significant developments in experimental, theoretical, and empirical aspects of financial economics. Included subfields are market microstructure, behavioral finance, experimental finance, financial institutions, capital markets, and corporate finance. 
As of 2022, Journal Citation Reports gives the journal a 2021 impact factor of 2.741, ranking it fifty-sixth of 111 journal titles in the category "Business, Finance" and 140th of 379 in the category "Economics". It is abstracted and indexed in Scopus, Social Sciences Citation Index, INSPEC, EconLit, and PAIS International.

Editorial processes
The Annual Review of Financial Economics is helmed by the editor or the co-editors. The editor is assisted by the editorial committee, which includes associate editors, regular members, and occasionally guest editors. Guest members participate at the invitation of the editor, and serve terms of one year. All other members of the editorial committee are appointed by the Annual Reviews board of directors and serve five-year terms. The editorial committee determines which topics should be included in each volume and solicits reviews from qualified authors. Unsolicited manuscripts are not accepted. Peer review of accepted manuscripts is undertaken by the editorial committee.

Current editorial board
As of 2021, the editorial committee consists of the two co-editors and the following members:

 Tobias Adrian
 Yacine Aït-Sahalia
 Patrick Bolton
 Robert A. Jarrow
 Li Jin
 Kose John
 Deborah J. Lucas

See also
 Annual Review of Economics
 List of economics journals

References 

 

Economics journals
Financial Economics
Publications established in 2009
English-language journals
Annual journals